Castlereagh is a community in the Canadian province of Nova Scotia, located in  Colchester County. It was either named after Castlereagh in Northern Ireland or Robert Stewart, Viscount Castlereagh.

Once a bustling village, only a few houses remain in Castlereagh - the only people found there now  tend to be those occupying seasonal camps, typically for hunting or logging.

References

Castlereagh on Destination Nova Scotia

Communities in Colchester County
General Service Areas in Nova Scotia